Jeeri Reddy an American biologist who became an entrepreneur, developing new generation preventive and therapeutic vaccines. He has been an active leader in the field of the biopharmaceutical industry, commercializing diagnostics and vaccines through JN-International Medical Corporation. He is the scientific director and president of the corporation that created the world's first serological rapid tests for Tuberculosis to facilitate acid-fast bacilli microscopy for the identification of smear-positive and negative cases. Prevention of mother-to-child transmission of HIV was achieved in South East Asia by the use of rapid tests developed by Reddy in 1999.  Reddy through his Corporation donated $173,050 worth of Rapid Diagnostic Tests (RDTs) for malaria in Zambia and actively participated in the prevention of child deaths due to Malaria infections. Reddy was personally invited by the president, George W. Bush, and First Lady Laura Bush to the White House for Malaria Awareness Day sponsored by US President Malaria Initiative (PMI) on Wednesday, April 25, 2007.

A notable inexpensive vaccine developed by Reddy is for Meningococcal meningitis for Prevention of Meningitis disease outbreaks in sub-Saharan Africa, His main objective is to facilitate affordable biological medicines to the resource poor countries. His leadership on global health matters in Africa and South East Asia is encouraged by former president Bill Clinton through the Clinton Global Initiative. Reddy has been dedicated to the prevention of infectious diseases by promoting public awareness and education about immunization for vaccine-preventable diseases in underdeveloped countries. The people who have helped him to become a business person are his classmates and friends from the school of Microbiology and Pharmaceutical Sciences. He has created jobs in Nebraska, USA, Africa and South East Asia through his company. Prior to forming the corporation by him in 1997, Reddy served as microbiologist, visiting professor and laboratory director at ICRISAT, Kansas State University and Central States Research Center, Oakland, Nebraska. Reddy is an inventor on five U.S. & International (PCT) Patents and publishes Journal articles of its research and technologies in the field of human Infectious Diseases and Neurological Disorders. Reddy has been a post-doctoral fellow from Kansas State University, Manhattan, Kansas In June 1993, he was awarded by The Society of Phi Zeta of Kansas State University for his research findings of a vaccine against enteric, respiratory and reproductive disease-causing virus.
Life sciences contributions at Research Gate:

References

21st-century American biologists
21st-century American inventors
American health care chief executives
Businesspeople from Omaha, Nebraska
University of California, Berkeley alumni
American investors
Living people
Year of birth missing (living people)